Painter Babu is a 1983 Indian Hindi-language film  directed by Ashok V. Bhushan, starring Rajiv Goswami, Meenakshi Sheshadri and Neelima in lead roles.

Cast
Rajiv Goswami 
Meenakshi Sheshadri
Neelima
Rakesh Bedi

Soundtrack
Kab Talak Shama Jali Yaad Nahin Sung by Lata Mangeshkar and Mahendra Kapoor, music by Uttam Singh

References

External links

1983 films
1980s Hindi-language films